Hexagonite is the red to pink, lilac to purple manganoan variety of tremolite.  A rare amphibole, it can be transparent, translucent, and rarely opaque.

Properties
Hexagonite is pleochroic, potentially displaying varying shades of blue, violet, purple, or red. It is also known as "mangan-tremolite", since the manganese imparts the mineral's unique colors.  Pink, lilac, and purple are the most common colors.  Hexagonite has been successfully faceted.

Chemical formulae and history
Tremolite was discovered in 1789. Hexagonite, a varietal form of tremolite, has a Mohs hardness of 5.0-6.0.  Like tremolite, it is a calcium magnesium silicate hydroxide with the formula: Ca2Mg5 (Si8O22) (OH)2.

The mineral was given the name, hexagonite, because its crystal structure was believed at one time to be hexagonal.  Since then, however, it has been found to be monoclinic.

Occurrence
The mineral is found primarily in the Balmat-Edwards zinc district of Edwards, St. Lawrence County, New York, United States.  It was also found in the Czech Republic in the Chýnov caves.

References

Minerals